Balcarras School is an academy school for 11- to 18-year-olds, located in Charlton Kings, Cheltenham, Gloucestershire, England. Since 2016, the school's headteacher has been Dominic Burke.

The school was rated as "Outstanding" when last inspected by Ofsted in 2014.

Balcarras School is the preferred sponsor for a new secondary school in Cheltenham, named The High School Leckhampton, which is planned to open in 2022.

In November 2020 Balcarras was named Sunday Times State school of the Decade.

References

External links
 OFSTED Report 2005

 

Schools in Cheltenham
Educational institutions established in 1986
Secondary schools in Gloucestershire
1986 establishments in England
Training schools in England
Academies in Gloucestershire